Phyllonorycter esperella is a moth of the family Gracillariidae. It is found from Sweden to the Pyrenees, Italy and Greece and from Great Britain to Ukraine.

The wingspan is 7–9 mm. Adults are on wing in May and August in two generations in western Europe.

The larvae feed on Carpinus betulus and Ostrya carpinifolia. They mine the leaves of their host plant. They create an upper-surface tentiform mine. At first, the mine is nearly round, silvery, and flat, and is centred over a side vein. Later, the mine becomes strongly contracted and sometimes almost doubles the leaf.

References

External links
bladmineerders.nl

Moths described in 1783
esperella
Moths of Europe